Zsolt Horváth may refer to:

 Zsolt Horváth (footballer) (born 1988), Hungarian football player and television sports commentator
 Zsolt Horváth (gymnast) (born 1968), Hungarian gymnast
 Zsolt Horváth (politician, born 1964), Hungarian physician, dentist and politician
 Zsolt Horváth (politician, born 1969), Hungarian jurist and politician